Class III may refer to:
Class III antiarrhythmic
Class III β-tubulin
Class III electrical appliance
Class III gaming
Class III NFA firearm
Class III PI 3-kinase
Class III railroad
Luminosity class III (giant) star in the Yerkes or MK-system
 Pesticide Toxicity Class Class III 
World Health Organization
United States Environmental Protection Agency
EU

See also 
Class 3 (disambiguation)